Mulleria may mean:
 Müller's larva
 Mulleria, Kasaragod, a town in Kerala in India